The Brazil national under-17 football team, also known as Brazil Under-17s or Seleção Sub-17, represents Brazil in association football, at an under-17 age level and is controlled by the Brazilian Football Confederation, the governing body for football in Brazil. Their head coach is Phelipe Leal.

Brazil hosted the 2019 FIFA U-17 World Cup. It was the first time that Brazil ever hosted a FIFA youth tournament. The tournament cumulated in Brazil lifting their 4th FIFA U-17 World Cup, making it the first time ever that Brazil had won a FIFA World Cup competition at home.

Competitive record
A gold background color indicates that Brazil won the tournament.

FIFA U-17 World Cup

South American Under-17 Football Championship

1Draws include knockout matches decided on penalty kicks.

*Draws include knockout matches decided on penalty kicks.

Current squad
The following players were called up to the Brazil squad for the Montaigu Tournament.

Head coach:  Paulo Victor Gomes

Honours

FIFA U-17 World Cup:
 Champions (4): 1997, 1999, 2003, 2019
 Runners-up (2): 1995, 2015
South American U-17 Championship:
 Champions (12): 1988, 1991, 1995, 1997, 1999, 2001, 2005, 2007, 2009, 2011, 2015, 2017
 Runners-up (3): 1985, 1986, 2003

Friendlies

 Montaigu Tournament:
Winners (2): 1984, 2022
 Paolo Valenti Trophy:
Winners: 1993
 Virginia State Youth Cup
 Winners: 1993
 Toto Cup:
 Winners: 2000
 Salerno Youth Tournament:
 Winners (2): 2000, 2001
 Mundialito João Havelange:
 Winners (2): 2000, 2002
 Three Nations Cup:
 Winners (2): 2000, 2001
 Torneio Cidade de Canoas:
 Winners: 2005
 Mediterranean International Cup U-16:
 Winners: 2006
 Copa 2 de Julho:
 Winners (3): 2009, 2010, 2013
 Nike International Friendlies:
 Winners (2): 2014, 2017
 Suwon Cup:
 Winners: 2015
 BRICS U-17 Football Cup:
 Winners: 2016, 2018

See also 
 Brazil national football team
 Brazil Olympic football team
 Brazil national under-20 football team
 South American Under-17 Football Championship
 Santos FC and the Brazil national football team

References

Youth football in Brazil
South American national under-17 association football teams
Under-17